Thomas Bauer (born 23 April 1984) is a German short track speed skater. He competed in the men's 5000 metre relay event at the 2006 Winter Olympics.

References

External links
 

1984 births
Living people
German male short track speed skaters
Olympic short track speed skaters of Germany
Short track speed skaters at the 2006 Winter Olympics
Sportspeople from Munich